A therapeutic boarding school is a residential school offering therapy for students with emotional or behavioral issues. The National Association of Therapeutic Schools and Programs listed 140 schools and programs as of 2005.

Description
A type of boarding school that delivers therapy whilst students attend the school.  Example of types of therapy offered by some schools include:

Attack therapy, Cognitive behavioural therapy, Equine therapy, Primal Scream therapy.

Accreditation
Therapeutic boarding schools may be accredited by an academic accreditation body, such as the New England Association of Schools and Colleges, AdvanceED divisions, and National Independent Private Schools Association.

The National Association of Therapeutic Schools and Programs (NATSAP) is a non-profit association of state-licensed or nationally-accredited therapeutic programs.

The U.S. Federal Trade Commission (FTC) advises that several independent nonprofit organizations, such as the Joint Commission (JACHO), the Council on Accreditation (COA), and the Commission on Accreditation of Rehabilitation Facilities (CARF) accredit mental health programs and providers.

Criticisms 
Some organizations, such as the Bazelon Center question the appropriateness and efficacy of group placements, citing failure of some programs to address problems in the child's home and community environment, lack of mental health services, and substandard educational programs.  Concerns specifically related to private therapeutic boarding schools include inappropriate discipline techniques, medical neglect, restricted communication (such as lack of access to child protection and advocacy hotlines), and lack of monitoring and regulation.

From late 2007 through 2008, a coalition of medical and psychological organizations that included members of Alliance for the Safe, Therapeutic and Appropriate use of Residential Treatment (ASTART) and the Community Alliance for the Ethical Treatment of Youth (CAFETY), provided testimony and support that led to the creation of the Stop Child Abuse in Residential Programs for Teens Act of 2008 by the United States Congress Committee on Education and Labor.

The U.S. Government Accountability Office Report has reported on negligence at residential treatment programs including wilderness therapy, boot camps, and academies:GAO reviewed thousands of allegations of abuse, some of which involved death, at residential treatment programs across the country and in American-owned and American-operated facilities abroad between the years 1990 and 2007. Allegations included reports of abuse and death recorded by state agencies and the Department of Health and Human Services, allegations detailed in pending civil and criminal trials with hundreds of plaintiffs, and claims of abuse and death that were posted on the Internet. GAO did not attempt to evaluate the benefits of residential treatment programs or verify the facts regarding the thousands of allegations it reviewed.

See also
Wilderness therapy
Therapeutic community
Alternative school
Outdoor education
Residential education
Residential treatment center
Troubled teen industry

References

Further reading
 

School types
Therapeutic community
Boarding schools
Therapeutic boarding schools